Rare Pearls is a 1999 collection of rare Janis Joplin Studio recordings with Big Brother and the Holding Company and live performances with The Kozmic Blues Band. It was released only as part of the box set Box of Pearls (1999), which contained reissues of all of Joplin's albums with added bonus tracks, and this compilation.

Track listing

References

1999 compilation albums
Janis Joplin albums